James or Jim Conklin may refer to:

James Conklin (politician) (1831–1899), mayor of Madison, Wisconsin, 1881–1883
James Wesley "Patty" Conklin (1892–?), founder of Conklin Shows, a traveling amusement corporation in North America
James Dean Conklin, animator of  Migraine Boy
James Conklin, actor in  Teenagers from Outer Space
Private Jim Conklin, a character in The Red Badge of Courage